Mount Huxley is a  mountain in the Sierra Nevada, in Fresno County. It is on the Goddard Divide in Kings Canyon National Park and rises above the Evolution Basin. Other nearby mountains in the group include Mount Darwin, Mount Fiske, Mount Haeckel, Mount Mendel, Mount Spencer, Mount Wallace, and Mount Lamarck. The area around the peaks, known as the Evolution Region, includes Evolution Basin, Evolution Valley, Evolution Meadow and Evolution Creek.

History
Theodore S. Solomons named a series of mountains for six of the major exponents of the theory of evolution. Mount Huxley is named for English biologist and anthropologist Thomas Henry Huxley who specialized in comparative anatomy. He is known as "Darwin's Bulldog".

References

Mountains of Kings Canyon National Park
Mountains of Fresno County, California